Rockwood is a historic house in the vicinity of Montpelier Station, Orange County, Virginia. It was built in 1848 and is a -story frame house which was designed in a blend of the Gothic Revival and Greek Revival styles.  The house sits on a brick English basement and has an offset sharply pitched cross-gable roof.

It was added to the National Register of Historic Places on July 5, 2001.

References

Houses on the National Register of Historic Places in Virginia
Carpenter Gothic houses in Virginia
Greek Revival houses in Virginia
Houses completed in 1848
Houses in Orange County, Virginia
National Register of Historic Places in Orange County, Virginia